Donald Edward Reynolds (born April 16, 1953) is an American former professional baseball player. He played in Major League Baseball (MLB) as an outfielder for the San Diego Padres from 1978 to 1979. His younger brother Harold Reynolds was also a Major League Baseball player.

Biography

Early life
Reynolds was born in Arkadelphia, Arkansas and was raised in Corvallis, Oregon. Don attended Corvallis High School in Corvallis, Oregon, starring in football, basketball and baseball.  He was a member of the 3A State Championship football team in 1970. He graduated from Corvallis High in 1971.

College
Reynolds initially went to the University of Oregon with the sole intent of playing baseball only.  At 5'8" and 178lbs, many coaches believed he was not built to play major college football.  Oregon Duck football coach Jerry Frei managed to talk Reynolds into playing on the freshman football team in the fall of 1971, where he dominated on both sides of the ball.  Reynolds would go on to be one of the nation’s top two-sport athletes in the mid-1970s.

In football, he paced Oregon in rushing three straight seasons, averaged 8.1 yards per carry as a sophomore and gained more than 1,000 yards as a junior, only the second in the school’s history to surpass that figure at the time. As a three-year starter and all-conference performer in baseball, he finished with seven career records, including hits, runs batted in and stolen bases.  He batted .315 for his career and was drafted by the San Diego Padres after his Oregon career.

Reynolds was inducted into the University of Oregon Athletics Hall of Fame in 1993 as a football player.

Professional career
Reynolds was drafted in the 18th round of the 1975 amateur draft by the San Diego Padres.  Reynolds spent several seasons in the minor leagues before being called up by the Padres and making his major league debut on April 7, 1978.  He played in two seasons of Major League Baseball, both with the Padres.

References

External links

 Oregon Ducks bio

1953 births
Living people
American football running backs
Arizona Diamondbacks scouts
Atlanta Braves scouts
Colorado Rockies scouts
Baseball players from Arkansas
Major League Baseball outfielders
Oregon Ducks baseball players
Oregon Ducks football players
San Diego Padres players
Sportspeople from Corvallis, Oregon
Corvallis High School (Oregon) alumni
African-American baseball players
Alaska Goldpanners of Fairbanks players
Amarillo Gold Sox players
Hawaii Islanders players
Spokane Indians players
Walla Walla Padres players